Ozhaino Jurdy Jiandro "Ozzie" Albies (born January 7, 1997) is a Curaçaoan professional baseball second baseman for the Atlanta Braves of Major League Baseball (MLB). Albies signed with the Braves organization in 2013, and made his MLB debut with the team in 2017. During his first full season, Albies was named to the 2018 Major League Baseball All-Star Game. He won the National League Silver Slugger Award for second basemen twice, in 2019 and 2021. In 2021 he won the Heart & Hustle Award.

Early life
Albies was born in Willemstad, Curaçao, to parents Osgarry and Judari. His father died in 2013 of a heart attack, aged 40. Albies has a younger brother, Zhhihir, and sister, Jeanalyn.

Career

Minor leagues

Albies started playing baseball at the age of six, and began switch hitting in 2013. Discovered by the Curaçao-based scout Dargello Lodowica, Albies was signed by the Atlanta Braves for $350,000 as an international free agent on July 2, 2013. Influencing his decision to sign was the Braves' connection to Andruw Jones and Andrelton Simmons, both, like Albies, natives of Curaçao. He made his professional debut in 2014 with the Gulf Coast Braves and joined the Danville Braves in July. In 57 games, Albies hit .364/.446/.444 with a home run. After the season, he was ranked among the top 100 prospects in baseball by Keith Law, and fifth-best in Braves farm system by Baseball America.

Albies began the 2015 season with the Rome Braves. In July, he was named to the All Star Futures Game. He was the only Braves prospect to appear in the game that year, as well as the youngest player on the field. Albies went 1-2 in the game, which the World Team lost to the U.S. 10–1. He fractured his right thumb during the first week of August and missed the remainder of the season. In 98 games, Albies hit .310/.368/.404, stole 29 bases, and committed 17 errors. MLB.com placed him third on the list of top Braves prospects at the end of 2015, and 30th overall throughout the minors.

Albies was invited to spring training in 2016, and opened the season with the Double A Mississippi Braves. After 22 appearances with Mississippi, he hit .369/.442/.512 and was promoted to the Triple A Gwinnett Braves on April 30. In two months with Gwinnett, Albies hit .248/.307/.351. On June 30, he returned to Mississippi, playing second base alongside shortstop Dansby Swanson. Upon Swanson's promotion to the major leagues, Albies remained in Mississippi, having hit for a .292 batting average and a .778 OPS between the Double A and Triple A levels. Mississippi made the Southern League playoffs, but Albies injured his right elbow in the first postseason game and sat out the remainder of the season.

Atlanta Braves

2017
Albies was again invited to spring training at the start of the 2017 season. He was called up later that year on August 1, and made his major league debut against the Los Angeles Dodgers. On August 3, 2017, against the Dodgers, Albies hit his first career home run for his first Major League hit.

2018
Albies was part of the Braves' Opening Day starting lineup to open the 2018 season. On June 12, 2018, Albies hit a grand slam against the New York Mets en route to an 8–2 win. Albies became the youngest player ever to have two grand slams. On June 25, 2018, Albies hit his first career walk-off home run against the Cincinnati Reds. On July 8, 2018, while owning a .281 batting average with 18 home runs and 50 RBIs, Albies was named an All-Star via the player vote in his first full year in the major leagues. On July 11, against the Toronto Blue Jays, he had his first career multi-home run game. 

In 2018, he batted .261/.305/.452 with 24 home runs and 72 RBIs. On defense, he committed 10 errors, fourth-most of all NL second basemen.

2019
On April 11, 2019, Albies signed a seven-year, $35 million extension to remain with the Braves. The deal includes options for the 2026 and 2027 seasons. Both years are worth $7 million with a $4 million buyout.

In 2019, he batted .295/.352/.500 with 102 runs, 24 home runs, 86 RBIs, and 112 strikeouts. Albies and teammates Ronald Acuña Jr. and Freddie Freeman won the 2019 National League Silver Slugger Awards for second base, outfield, and first base, respectively. On defense, in 2019 he had the best fielding percentage of all major league second basemen (.994).

2020
In the 2020 COVID-19 pandemic-shortened season, he batted .271/.306/.466 with six home runs and 19 RBIs.

2021
On June 3, 2021, Albies recorded his 500th career hit, an RBI double off of Washington Nationals reliever Sam Clay. Albies was selected as a reserve for the 2021 All-Star Game. When Albies hit his twenty-fifth home run of the season on September 4, the 2021 Atlanta Braves became the second team in Major League Baseball history to have its starting infielders hit twenty-five home runs each. On September 22, Albies recorded his thirtieth home run and one hundredth RBI of the season, marking the first time in his career that he reached either milestone. He became the first second baseman in Braves franchise history to have hit thirty home runs and driven in one hundred runs in the same season. While playing the Philadelphia Phillies on September 29, Albies scored his 100th run of the season. 

In the 2021 season, he batted .259/.310/.488 in 629 at bats (2nd in the NL), with 103 runs (4th), 40 doubles (3rd), 7 triples (3rd), 30 home runs, 106 RBIs (3rd), and 128 strikeouts.  He swung at a higher percentage of pitches in the strike zone than any other major leaguer, at 83.4%. On defense, he led all second basemen with 389 assists and committed 8 errors, fourth-most of all NL second basemen. The Braves finished with an 88–73 record, clinching the NL East, and eventually won the 2021 World Series, giving the Braves their first title since 1995. Following the 2021 season, Albies won a second Silver Slugger Award, as well as the Heart and Hustle Award.

2022
On June 11, 2022, Albies hit a grand slam off of St. Louis Cardinals pitcher Chris Stratton. Albies fractured his left foot in a game against the Washington Nationals on June 13, 2022. He was subsequently placed on the 60-day injured list and underwent a surgical procedure, performed by Robert Anderson. Albies returned to the active roster on September 16. The next day, Albies fractured his right pinky while sliding into second base.

References

External links

1997 births
Atlanta Braves players
Curaçao expatriate baseball players in the United States
Danville Braves players
Gulf Coast Braves players
Gwinnett Braves players
Living people
Major League Baseball players from Curaçao
Major League Baseball second basemen
Mississippi Braves players
National League All-Stars
People from Willemstad
Rome Braves players
Silver Slugger Award winners